Paul Kellner (June 6, 1890 – April 3, 1972) was a German backstroke swimmer, who competed in the 1912 Summer Olympics. He was born in Spandau and died in Berlin. Kellner participated in only one event and won the bronze medal in the 100 metre backstroke competition.

References

External links
profile

1890 births
1972 deaths
Male backstroke swimmers
German male swimmers
Olympic swimmers of Germany
Swimmers at the 1912 Summer Olympics
Olympic bronze medalists for Germany
Olympic bronze medalists in swimming
People from Spandau
Medalists at the 1912 Summer Olympics